Restless is a 2022 French action thriller film directed by Régis Blondeau, written by Régis Blondeau and Julien Colombani and starring Franck Gastambide, Simon Abkarian and Michaël Abiteboul. It is based on the 2014 South Korean film A Hard Day by  Kim Seong-hun.

Cast 
 Franck Gastambide as Thomas
 Simon Abkarian as Marelli
 Michaël Abiteboul as Marc
 Tracy Gotoas as Naomi
 Jemima West as Agathe
 Serge Hazanavicius as Commissaire Vaubour
 Victoire Zenner as Louise
 Perez Michael as Michael Bourgi
 Nabil Missoumi as Barcelo
 Fabrice de la Villehervé as Responsible Chambre Mortuaire

References

External links
 
 

2022 films
2020s French-language films
French action films
Remakes of South Korean films
Action film remakes
French-language Netflix original films
2020s French films